is the soundtrack to the 2006 film Paprika and was released on November 23, 2006 under the TESLAKITE label. It was composed by Susumu Hirasawa. A bonus movie was included with the CD.

The soundtrack is notable for being one of the first film scores to use Vocaloid (Lola as the "voicebank") for vocals. It's also the last of Hirasawa's albums where an Amiga computer was used for composition. All MIDI was sequenced through an Amiga 4000 running the Bars n Pipes program.

Track listing

"Parade" was originally released on the album Byakkoya - White Tiger Field. "The Girl in Byakkoya - White Tiger Field" is a slight rerecording of that album's title track.

Personnel
Susumu Hirasawa - Voice, Electronic keyboard, Amiga, Personal computer, Digital audio workstation, Synthesizers, Vocaloid, Sampler, Sequencer, Programming, Production
Masanori Chinzei - Recording, Mixing, Mastering
Rihito Yumoto and Mika Hirano (Chaos Union) - A&R
Kiyoshi Inagaki - Design
Jodi Tack - Album Art Direction (US release)
Hideki Namai - Photography
Satoshi Kon - Art (movie stills on US release)
Syotaro Takami and Nicholas D. Kent - Translation
Dave Plisky - Translation (US release)
Masaru Owaku - VideoClip direction
Thanks: UK Nakagaw, Usagi Tanaka

Release history

References

External links
 Paprika Original Soundtrack at NO ROOM

Susumu Hirasawa albums
Anime soundtracks
2006 soundtrack albums